College SA is a Distance Learning Private and Business College, located in Tygervalley Bellville, South Africa. College SA offers Business, Technical and Vocational Education and Training (TVET) to students, both in South Africa and internationally.

History
College SA was initially established in partnership with the Curro School Group, as Curro College in 2007. In 2008, the Curro School Partners sold their shares, and Curro College became College SA.

In 2016 the majority shareholding in the company was sold to JSE listed RECM and Calibre Limited (RAC). During this time the College was relocated from Bellville South to its current location in Tygervalley Bellville.

In 2019, Optimi acquired College SA in a bid to broaden its offering in the distance learning market.

The Optimi group provides offerings in 4 divisions: Home, Workplace, Classroom and College. Together, these divisions service over 200 000 learners per annum.

Optimi College provides accessible accredited and short courses for adults. College SA, founded in 2007, provides a range of distance learning TVET offerings across the region, including adult matric through Matric Works.

Accreditation and registration
Optimi College (Pty) Ltd T/A College SA. Reg no: 2007/017012/07. Optimi College Pty (Ltd) (previously known as SA College of Home Study) is member of the Optimi Group and is provisionally registered with the Department of Higher Education and Training (DHET), Reg no: 2009/ FE07/099.

College SA is accredited by the following accrediting/professional bodies:
 Umalusi which offers Engineering/Technical studies N1-N3. Accreditation Number is: 15 FET02 00025
 Fasset for Bookkeeping and Accounting qualifications
 ICB Financial Accounting; Public Sector Accounting; Business Management; Entrepreneurship; Office Administration
 SABPP who offer a Human Resource Management registered on the National Qualifications Framework (NQF)
 CIMA offers CIMA's Certificate in Business Accounting
 Microsoft who offers the following pathways: Microsoft Technical Associate (MTA) certifications; MCSA Microsoft Windows 8; MCSA & MCSE Microsoft Windows Server; MCSA & MCSE Microsoft SQL Server; MCSD Microsoft Web & Store Applications
 CompTIA for CompTIA A+ and Network+ certifications.

Mode of delivery
College SA is a distance learning provider. All of their courses are offered via correspondence, and are available to students all over South Africa, as well as international students. Academic support is provided to students by an online classroom, Educational Planners and course tutor.

Location
College SA located in Cape Town, South Africa.

References

Universities and colleges in South Africa
Distance education institutions based in South Africa